The Lokmanya Tilak Terminus–Bareilly Weekly Express is an Express train belonging to Northern Railway zone that runs between Lokmanya Tilak Terminus and  in India. It is currently being operated with 14313/14314 train numbers on a weekly basis. It is the first train to run between Mumbai to bareilly. It's started from dadar but however shifted to ltt

Service

The 14313/Mumbai LTT–Bareilly Weekly Express has an average speed of 51 km/hr and covers 1604 km in 31h 35m. The 14314/Bareilly–Mumbai LTT Weekly Express Express has an average speed of 57 km/hr and covers 1604 km in 28h 45m.

Route and halts 

The important halts of the train are:

 Lokmanya Tilak Terminus

Coach composition

The train has standard ICF rakes with max speed of 110 kmph. The train consists of 23 coaches:

 1 AC II Tier
 5 AC III Tier
 12 Sleeper coaches
 4 General
 2 Seating cum Luggage Rake

Traction

Both trains are hauled by an WAP-4 electric locomotive or WAP-7 from Mumbai to Agra Fort From[Agra Fort,WDP-4 diesel locomotive uptil Bareilly and vice versa.

Banker locomotive is attached at Kasara and are detached at Igatpuri.

Rake sharing

The train shares its rake with 14319/14320 Indore–Bareilly Weekly Express.

See also 

 Indore–Bareilly Weekly Express
 Kanpur Central–Amritsar Weekly Express

Notes

References

External links 

 14313/Mumbai LTT–Bareilly Weekly Express
 14314/Bareilly–Mumbai LTT Weekly Express

Transport in Mumbai
Trains from Bareilly
Express trains in India
Rail transport in Maharashtra
Rail transport in Madhya Pradesh